Otto Georg Thierack (19 April 188926 October 1946) was a German Nazi jurist and politician.

Early life and career

Thierack was born in Wurzen in Saxony. He took part in the First World War from 1914 to 1918 as a volunteer, reaching the rank of lieutenant. He suffered a facial injury and was decorated with the Iron Cross, second class. After the war ended, he resumed his interrupted law studies and ended them in 1920 with his Assessor (junior lawyer) examination. In the same year, he was hired as a court Assessor in Saxony.

Joining the Nazi Party
On 1 August 1932, Thierack joined the Nazi Party. After the Nazis seized power in 1933, he managed within a very short time to rise high in the ranks from a prosecutor to President of the People's Court (Volksgerichtshof). The groundwork on which this rise was built was not merely that Thierack had been a Nazi Party member, but rather also that he had been leader of the National Socialist jurists' organization, the so-called Rechtswahrerbund.

Justice Minister of Saxony
On 12 May 1933, having been appointed Saxony's justice minister, it was Thierack's job to "nazify" justice, which was a part of the Nazis' Gleichschaltung (Coordination) that he had to put into practice in Saxony. After going through several mid-level professional posts, he became Vice President of the Reich Court in 1935 and in May 1936 President of the Volksgerichtshof, which had been newly founded in 1934. He held this job, interrupted as it was by two stints in the armed forces, until August 1942, when he was succeeded in the position by Roland Freisler. On 20 August 1942, he succeeded Hans Frank as President of the Academy for German Law.

Reich Minister of Justice

On 24 August 1942, Thierack assumed the office of Reich Minister of Justice. He introduced the monthly Richterbriefe in October 1942, in which were presented model – from the Nazi leaders' standpoint – decisions, with names left out, upon which German jurisprudence was to be based. He also introduced the so-called Vorschauen and Nachschauen ("previews" and "inspections"). After this, the higher state court presidents, in proceedings of public interest, had at least every two weeks to discuss with the public prosecutor's office and the State Court president – who had to pass this on the responsible criminal courts – how a case was to be judged before the court's decision.

When he became Reich Minister of Justice in August 1942, Thierack saw to it that the lengthy paperwork involved in clemency proceedings for those sentenced to death was greatly shortened. In September of that year, he caused all those in custody who were "Jews, Gypsies, Ukrainians, Poles sentenced to over three years, Czechs, or Germans serving a sentence of over eight years" to be classified as "asocial elements" and transferred to Reichsführer-SS Heinrich Himmler to be exterminated through work.

At Thierack's instigation, the execution shed at Plötzensee Prison in Berlin was outfitted with eight iron hooks in December 1942 so that several people could be put to death at once, by hanging (there had already been a guillotine there for quite a while). The mass executions began on 7 September 1943 but due to their rapidity some prisoners were hanged "by mistake". Thierack dismissed these as errors and demanded that the hangings continue. Thierack was named to continue as Minister of Justice in Hitler's political testament. He served in the brief Goebbels cabinet but was dismissed on 5 May 1945 by Hitler's successor, Reichspräsident Karl Dönitz.

Arrest and suicide

The Allies arrested Thierack after the end of World War II. Before he was brought to trial before the court at the Nuremberg Judges' Trial, Thierack committed suicide in Sennelager, Paderborn, by poisoning himself.

References
Notes

Bibliography

External links

Biographical overview at the German Historical Museum 
 

1889 births
1946 deaths
German Army personnel of World War I
Holocaust perpetrators in Germany
Judges in the Nazi Party
Jurists from Saxony
Members of the Academy for German Law
Nazi Germany ministers
Nazi Party politicians
Nazis who committed suicide in Germany
Nazis who committed suicide in prison custody
People from the Kingdom of Saxony
People from Wurzen
Suicides by cyanide poisoning
1946 suicides
Prisoners who died in British military detention